TSS Slieve Bloom was a twin screw steamer cargo vessel operated by the London, Midland and Scottish Railway from 1930 to 1948, and the British Transport Commission from 1948 to 1965.

History

She was built by William Denny and Brothers of Dumbarton and launched in 1930. She had capacity for around 640 head of cattle. She was equipped with electrically operated cranes and Brown hydro-electric steering.

References

1930 ships
Steamships
Ships built on the River Clyde
Ships of the London, Midland and Scottish Railway